Rennie K. Tracey (April 30, 1874 – June 30, 1929) was a Canadian politician. He served in the Legislative Assembly of New Brunswick from 1921 to 1925 as member of the United Farmers.

References 

1874 births
1929 deaths